Vanjam is a 1953 Indian Tamil-language film directed by Y. R. Swamy. The film stars Kantha Rao, Gummadi, Savithri and Girija.

Cast 
List adapted from the database of Film News Anandan.

Male cast
Kantha Rao
Gummadi
K. Sarangapani
Rajnala

Female cast
Savithri
Girija
Seetha
Madhu

Production 
The film was produced by M. M. Reddy and directed by Y. R. Swamy. H. M. Reddy wrote the story along with N. Seetharaman who also penned the dialogues. D. L. Narayan and V. K. B. Maniam were in charge of cinematography while the editing was done by S. D. N. Krishna. L. V. Mantri and A. V. Dharma Rao handled the art direction. Choreography was by Chopra and Vembatti Satyam. Stunt Swaminathan was the Stunt master. Still photography was done by P. C. M. Eswar Babu.

The film was also produced in Telugu with the title Pratigna.

Soundtrack 
Music was composed by T. A. Kalyanam while the lyrics were penned by Guhan. Playback singers are Rohini, T. S. Bhagavathi, Jikki, A. P. Komala, K. Rani, Gajalakshmi and A. M. Rajah.

References

External links 

Indian drama films
Indian black-and-white films
1950s Tamil-language films
Films directed by Y. R. Swamy
1953 drama films
1953 films
Films scored by T. A. Kalyanam